Kivotos is a village and a community of the Grevena municipality. Before the 2011 local government reform it was a part of the municipality of Irakleotes, of which it was a municipal district. The 2011 census recorded 417 residents in the village. The community of Kivotos covers an area of 25.281 km2. According to the statistics of Vasil Kanchov ("Macedonia, Ethnography and Statistics"), 160 Greek Christians, 500 Vallahades (Grecophone Muslims) and 50 Romani lived in the village in 1900.

See also
 List of settlements in the Grevena regional unit

References

Populated places in Grevena (regional unit)